The U.S. Ballooning Hall of Fame is located at the National Balloon Museum in Indianola, Iowa.

The Hall of Fame "recognizes persons who have contributed in significant ways to the sport and or development of Ballooning."

The following persons have been inducted into the Hall of Fame:
2004: Paul E. (Ed) Yost
2005: Don N. Kersten, Sidney D. Cutter 
2006: Bruce Comstock, Peter Pellegrino
2007: Deke Sonnichsen, Malcolm Stevenson Forbes 
2008: Tracy Barnes, Eddie Allen 
2009: Jim Winker, Lucy Luck Stefan, Karl H. Stefan
2010: Anthony M. Fairbanks, Joseph W. Kittinger, Jr., Thomas A.F. Sheppard
2011: Ben L. Abruzzo, Maxie Anderson, Dewey Reinhard
2012: Carol Rymer Davis, Dr. William Grabb, Matt Wiederkehr
2013: Dennis E. Floden, William Murtorff, Dr. Clayton Lay Thomas
2014: Nikki Caplan, Chauncey Dunn, Don Piccard
2015: Robert Dodds Meddock, Jr., Constance C. Wolf
2016: Troy Bradley, Bill Bussey, Bob Sparks
2017: David Levin, Steve Fossett, Thaddeus Lowe
2018: Debbra Spaeth, Alan Blount, Ward Van Orman
 2019: Eleanor Vadala, Jim Birk—McAllen, Nick Saum 
2020: Coy Foster, Mark Sullivan

See also
Anderson-Abruzzo Albuquerque International Balloon Museum

References

External links
U.S. Ballooning Hall of Fame
National Balloon Museum

U.S. Ballooning Hall of Fame Inductees
Halls of fame in Iowa
Sports halls of fame
Ballooning U.S.
Museums in Warren County, Iowa
Indianola, Iowa